Xenia Gratsos (February 12, 1940 – August 8, 2018) was a Greek-American actress who worked both in film and on stage. She was born in Greece and moved to the United States to pursue her acting career. She had a long career with multiple roles in U.S. television and film. She lived in southern California with her husband, Eugene Robert Glazer.

Filmography

Film

Television

References

External links
  (as Brioni Farrell)

1940 births
2018 deaths
American television actresses
American film actresses
Greek emigrants to the United States
21st-century American women